Josias Jackson (1765–1819) was a military man and public figure in Saint Vincent and the United Kingdom. He was Member of Parliament for Southampton from 1807 to 1812.

Jackson was the son of Josias Jackson, MD, a planter in St Vincent, and Elizabeth Gerrald, of Saint Kitts. He served in the Carib War of 1795. In 1803 he moved to Southampton, where he served as colonel of the Volunteers and was elected MP in 1807. He stood down at the general election of 1812. He died in Saint Vincent on 30 August 1819.

References
 R. G. Thorne (ed.), The House of Commons 1790-1820,  vol. 3, pp. 289–290.

External links 
 

1765 births
1819 deaths
Members of the Parliament of the United Kingdom for English constituencies
UK MPs 1807–1812
Saint Vincent and the Grenadines people of Saint Kitts and Nevis descent